The 4th Airborne Brigade is a unit of the Argentine Army specialised in airborne assault operations. It is based in Córdoba, Córdoba Province. Together with the Ist Armoured Brigade, they make up the Rapid Deployment Force (Spanish: Fuerza de Despliegue Rápido - FDR).

Organization 
As of 2022 it consists of:

 IVth Airborne Brigade HQ (Córdoba)
 2nd Paratroopers Regiment "General Balcarce" (Córdoba)
 14th Paratroopers Regiment (Córdoba)
 601st Air Assault Regiment (Campo de Mayo)
 4th Paratrooper Artillery Group (Córdoba)
 4th Paratrooper Cavalry Scout Squadron (Córdoba)
 4th Paratrooper Engineer Company (Córdoba)
 4th Paratrooper Signal Company (Córdoba)
 4th Paratrooper Support Company (Córdoba)
 Logistic & Support Base "Córdoba" (Córdoba)

Equipment 
The members of the unit wear the red berets of the paratroopers with unit badges.

The Yarará Parachute Knife is a specially made dagger issued to Argentine 
paratroopers with a handguard that functions as a knuckleduster. Current issue models come with an emergency blade in the crossguard. During jumps, the knife is put in an easy-to-reach place, so it can be quickly used to cut some of the parachute cords in case of an emergency, such as the cords getting entangled.

References

External links
 Paratroopers of Argentina
 4th Parachute Brigade at Flickr
 4th Parachute Brigade at Flickr

Parachute Brigade
Parachute Brigade
Argentina
Parachute Brigade
Parachute Brigade (Argentina)